California state elections in 2016 were held on Tuesday, November 8, 2016, with the primary elections being held on June 7, 2016. In addition to the U.S. presidential race, California voters elected one member to the United States Senate, all of California's seats to the House of Representatives, all of the seats of the State Assembly, and all odd-numbered seats of the State Senate.

Pursuant to Proposition 14 passed in 2010, California uses a nonpartisan blanket primary for almost all races, with the presidential primary races being the notable exception. Under the nonpartisan blanket primary system, all the candidates for the same elected office, regardless of respective political party, run against each other at once during the primary. The candidates receiving the most and second-most votes in the primary election then become the contestants in the general election.

President of the United States

Democratic primary

Republican primary

General election

United States Senate

Under California's nonpartisan blanket primary law, passed as California Proposition 14 (2010), all candidates for Senate appear on the ballot, regardless of party.  Members of any party may vote for any candidate, with the top two vote getters moving on to the general election.  Incumbent Barbara Boxer did not seek re-election, which makes this the first open Senate seat election in 24 years in California.

United States House of Representatives

State Senate

State Assembly

Propositions

June primary election
Since the passage of a law in November 2011, state primary elections may only feature propositions placed on the ballot by the state legislature.

November general election
The number of propositions in this election was significantly larger than previous elections. The increase has been attributed to the relatively low number of signatures required for ballot placement for this election.  The number of signatures required for ballot placement is a percentage of the turnout in the previous election. Since the turnout in the November 2014 elections was low, the number of signatures required for ballot placement in 2016 was 365,880, whereas the typical requirement is well over half a million signatures.

References

External links 
California Official Voter Information Guide

 
California